is a railway station in Sasebo, Nagasaki, Japan. It is operated by Matsuura Railway and is located on the Nishi-Kyūshū Line.

The distance to Naka-Sasebo Station is only .

Lines
The station is served by the Nishi-Kyūshū Line.

Station layout
The station is elevated with a single side platform.

Environs
This station stands near the central area of Sasebo-City.
National Route 204
Yonkachō Shōtengai
JUSCO Sasebo - Connected with this station by a catwalk.
Sasebo Tamaya
Sankachō Shōtengai
Sasebo City Library
Sasebo city museum Shimanose art center
Sasebo Municipal General Hospital
KKR Sasebo Kyosai Hospital
Shinwa Bank

History
 The station opened on 10 March 1990.

Adjacent stations

References
Nagasaki statistical yearbook (Nagasaki prefectural office statistics section) (Japanese)

External links
 
Matsuura Railway (Japanese)

Railway stations in Japan opened in 1990
Railway stations in Nagasaki Prefecture
Sasebo